The Stronger Will is a 1928 American silent drama film directed by Bernard McEveety and starring Percy Marmont, Rita Carewe and Howard Truesdale.

Synopsis
A Wall Street financier's wife becomes involved with a rival businessman.

Cast
 Percy Marmont as Clive Morton 
 Rita Carewe as Estelle Marsh 
 Howard Truesdale as Stephen Marsh 
 Merle Farris as Marguerite Marsh 
 William Bailey as Ralph Walker 
 Erin La Bissoniere as Muriel Cassano

References

Bibliography
 Munden, Kenneth White. The American Film Institute Catalog of Motion Pictures Produced in the United States, Part 1. University of California Press, 1997.

External links

1928 films
1928 drama films
Silent American drama films
Films directed by Bernard McEveety
American silent feature films
1920s English-language films
American black-and-white films
1920s American films